A number of ships have been named Arabia including:

 , an ocean liner operated by Cunard
 Arabia (steamboat), a steamboat sunk in the Missouri River in the 1850s and later rediscovered
 , a P&O ocean liner

Ship names